Thermonectus basillaris is a species of diving beetle native to the eastern United States, southern Ontario, Canada, and Cuba. T. basillaris is a pioneering species that occurs in temporary ponds and readily fly.

References

Dytiscidae
Beetles of North America
Beetles described in 1829